Henry Anthony Duggan (1903–1968) was an Irish footballer. Described as a talented and speedy right winger, he played for both Leeds United and Newport County. Duggan was a dual internationalist and played for both Ireland teams  – the FAI XI and the IFA XI.

Biography
Duggan was born 8 June 1903 in County Dublin, Ireland

Leeds United
Duggan was playing intermediate football with Richmond United in Dublin when he was first spotted by Leeds United. He signed for the club on 1 May 1925 and scored his first league goal for Leeds on 6 November 1926 in a 2–2 draw with Sunderland. Despite this, he was initially confined to the reserves and only made a handful of first team appearances for United until he established himself as regular in the first team between 1930 and 1936. 
In 1932 he helped Leeds gain promotion to the First Division. His impressive goalscoring rate also endeared him to the fans.
In eleven years at Leeds, Duggan made 187 league appearances, scoring 45 goals. He also played a further 9 games in the FA Cup, scoring a further 2 goals. During the 1933–34 season Duggan scored 11 goals in 33 league appearances. This included two in a 5–1 home win against Liverpool on 24 March 1934, two against Everton in a 2–2 draw on 30 March 1934 and 2 in an 8–0 win against Leicester City in April 1934. On 11 November 1935, he also scored a hat-trick in a 7–2 win against Sheffield Wednesday at Elland Road.

Newport County
Duggan signed for Newport County on 1 October 1936 and in 1939 he captained the team as they won the Third Division South title. Duggan was a County player when he won his last international cap. While playing for County, Duggan made 91 league appearances and scored 13 goals. During the 1939–40 wartime season, Duggan also played 13 games for County in the South-West Regional League.

Irish international
When Duggan began his international career in 1927 there were, in effect, two Ireland teams, chosen by two rival associations. Both associations, the Northern Ireland – based IFA and the Irish Free State – based FAI claimed jurisdiction over the whole of Ireland and selected players from the whole island. As a result, several notable Irish players from this era, including Duggan, played for both teams.

FAI XI
Between 1927 and 1937 Duggan made 5 appearances and scored 1 goal for the FAI XI. He made his international debut on 23 April 1927 in a 2–1 defeat against Italy B at Lansdowne Road. Together with Mick O'Brien, Tommy Muldoon and Joe Kendrick, he became one of the first four English League-based players to play for the FAI XI. He then made his second appearance for the FAI XI on 11 May 1935 in a 3–1 away win against Belgium. Duggan made a further two appearances for the FAI XI during a European tour in May 1936. On 3 May he played in a 3–3 draw with Hungary and then on 9 May he played in a 5–1 win against Luxembourg. Other members of the touring party included Jimmy Dunne and Jimmy Kelly. On 7 November 1937 he made his final appearance for the FAI XI in a World Cup qualifier against Norway. A late goal from Duggan earned the FAI XI a 3–3 draw.

IFA XI
Between 1929 and 1935 Duggan made 8 appearances for the IFA XI. He made his debut for the IFA XI on 19 October 1929 in a 3–0 defeat against England. He played against England on three further occasions. On 17 October 1932 in a 1–0 defeat against England in Blackpool, Duggan, together with Jimmy Dunne, Jimmy Kelly and Paddy Moore, was one of four players born in what is now the Ireland to feature in the IFA XI forward line. Duggan also played twice for the IFA XI against Scotland and twice against Wales. He made his last appearance for the IFA XI in 2–1 defeat against Scotland on 11 November 1935

Later years
After retiring as a footballer, Duggan settled in Beeston, Leeds, living in Cross Flatts Drive. He was an ARP warden during the Second World War and later worked for a firm of glass merchants. Some reports suggest he worked at the Moorhouses jam factory on Old Lane, as a checker. He died in Leeds in 1968.

Honours

Leeds United

Second Division
Runners Up 1931–32: 1

Newport County

Third Division South
Winners 1938–39: 1

References

External links
Northern Ireland's Footballing Greats
www.leeds-fans.org.uk

1903 births
1968 deaths
Republic of Ireland association footballers
Pre-1950 IFA international footballers
Irish Free State international footballers
Irish Free State association footballers
Dual Irish international footballers
English Football League players
Leeds United F.C. players
Newport County A.F.C. players
Association footballers from County Dublin
People from Beeston, Leeds
Sportspeople from Yorkshire
Association football forwards